Tülin Özen is a Turkish actress. She has appeared in more than twenty films since 2003.

Theatre
Sersemler Evi
Güzel Şeyler Bizim Tarafta
Dil Kuşu
Vahşet Tanrısı

Filmography

Award

References

External links 

1979 births
Living people
Turkish film actresses
Best Actress Golden Orange Award winners
People from İskenderun
Istanbul Technical University alumni
Yeditepe University alumni